Fort Franklin may refer to:

Canada
 Délı̨nę, Northwest Territories, formerly known as Fort Franklin

United States
 Fort Franklin (New York), built as a British fortification in Huntington during the Revolutionary War
 Fort Franklin Battlespace Laboratory, Hanscom AFB, Massachusetts
 Franklin's Fort, fort in Kansas to garrison pro-slavery forces in Bleeding Kansas
 Franklin, Idaho, built on the site of Mormon Fort Franklin (1860–1863)
 Franklin, Pennsylvania, built on the site of the late-18th century French Fort Machault, which was rebuilt in the 1780s as Fort Franklin